Xephyr  is display server software implementing the X11 display server protocol based on KDrive which targets a window on a host X Server as its framebuffer. It is written by Matthew Allum. Xephyr is an X-on-X implementation and runs on X.Org Server and can work with Glamor. Future versions could make use of libinput. Replacing Xephyr with the xf86-video-dummy and xf86-video-nested drivers in the normal X.Org server is being considered as part of X11R7.8.

Features
Unlike the similar Xnest, Xephyr supports modern X extensions (even if host server doesn't) such as composite, damage, randr, etc. It uses SHM images and shadow framebuffer updates to provide good performance. It also has a visual debugging mode for observing screen updates.

Limitations
Xorg's version of Xephyr uses only software rendering for OpenGL, but Feng Haitao has developed a forked version of Xephyr which can do hardware-accelerated rendering if the underlying X server has the capability.

See also
 Thin client
 rio (windowing system)

References

External links
 

X servers